Ameri-Cana Ultralights was a Canadian aircraft manufacturer that was formed to produce the Ameri-Cana Eureka for the US FAR 103 Ultralight Vehicles category and the American market.

History
The company was formed by Wilf Stark in 1997 with the successful first flight of the Eureka. The aircraft was intended to fill what Ameri-Cana perceived as an under-served niche in the market - an inexpensive ultralight that was also quick to assemble. The Eureka was initially sold complete, including engine for US$6000 and could be assembled in two weekends.

The prototype Eureka first flew in August 1997. The company then commenced manufacturing and marketing kits.

In 1999, reviewer Andre Cliche said: "The kit sells for $6000, which is amazingly low when you consider that this number even includes the engine, propeller and basic instruments. I wonder if they will stay in business for long with such a low profit margin?"

After introduction, the price was increased to US$5000 for the airframe alone, estimating that it could be completed for US$8000 total. The company ceased providing kits in July 2003 stating "The Eureka has been withdrawn from the market due to lack of resources."

Aircraft

References

External links

Photo of Wilf Stark of Ameri-Cana Ultralights with a Eureka

Defunct aircraft manufacturers of Canada
Defunct manufacturing companies of Canada